The Guinston United Presbyterian Church is an historic Presbyterian church building which is located in Chanceford Township, Pennsylvania, York County, Pennsylvania. 

It was added to the National Register of Historic Places in 1976.

History and architectural features
Built in 1773, the Guinston United Presbyterian Church is a one-story, fieldstone building with minimal ornamentation. It features paneled semi-circular inserts above the doors and rounded arch windows. 

It replaced an earlier log church which had been built in 1754. By 1867, that structure was used as a Sabbath School while a new sanctuary was built nearby.

It was added to the National Register of Historic Places in 1976.

References

External links
Guinston Presbyterian Church website

Historic American Buildings Survey in Pennsylvania
Presbyterian churches in Pennsylvania
Churches on the National Register of Historic Places in Pennsylvania
Churches completed in 1773
18th-century Presbyterian church buildings in the United States
Churches in York County, Pennsylvania
National Register of Historic Places in York County, Pennsylvania